Felix Dornebusch (born 12 July 1994) is a German professional footballer who plays as a goalkeeper for 3. Liga club VfB Oldenburg.

Career
In January 2023, free agent Dornebusch joined 3. Liga club VfB Oldenburg.

Career statistics

References

External links
 

1994 births
Living people
People from Witten
Sportspeople from Arnsberg (region)
German footballers
Footballers from North Rhine-Westphalia
Association football goalkeepers
2. Bundesliga players
Regionalliga players
VfL Bochum players
VfL Bochum II players
1. FC Nürnberg players
Eintracht Braunschweig players
Fortuna Sittard players
VfB Oldenburg players
German expatriate footballers
German expatriate sportspeople in the Netherlands
Expatriate footballers in the Netherlands